Negoreloe or Nieharelaje (Negarehlaje; Russian: Негорелое, Negoreloe) is an agrotown in the Dzyarzhynsk District of Minsk Region in Belarus.

Location 
Located on the river Peretut' 10 km southwest of Dzyarzhinsk, 48 km from Minsk.

History

Known from the 16th century as a post station on the Minsk-Navahrudak route, when it was part of the Polish–Lithuanian Commonwealth. The settlement was part of the estates of the powerful Radziwiłł magnate family. In the Second Partition of Poland, in 1793, it was annexed by the Russian Empire. In the early 19th century the village passed to the Abłamowicz family and in 1879 to renown Polish numismatist Emeryk Hutten-Czapski. From 1871 it has a railway station, which in 1921-1939 was a Soviet border station on the border with Poland. During World War II, the settlement was under German occupation from 1941 to 1944.

Economics 
There is a hive manufacturing factory as well as a private furniture manufacture.

References 

Populated places in Minsk Region
Dzyarzhynsk District
Minsk Voivodeship